Mineros is a city of Bolivia, capital of the Mineros Municipality of the Santa Cruz Department, 83 km north of the city of Santa Cruz de la Sierra. Due to the policy of the 1960s that forced the indigenous people of the Altiplano to immigrate, 23.3% of the population knows how to speak Quechua.

Population

References

Populated places in Santa Cruz Department (Bolivia)